Jackie Condon (born 1938) is an Irish retired hurler who played as a right wing-back for club side Erin's Own and at inter-county level with the Waterford senior hurling team.

Honours

Erin's Own
Waterford Senior Hurling Championship (1): 1962

Waterford
All-Ireland Senior Hurling Championship (1): 1959
Munster Senior Hurling Championship (1): 1959

References

1938 births
Living people
Erin's Own (Waterford) hurlers
Waterford inter-county hurlers